Zap2it is an American website and affiliate network that provides local television listings for areas of the United States and Canada. The site is produced by Nexstar Media Group. Zap2it affiliates include Wave Broadband, Cox, Dish Network, Disney,  Sinclair Broadcast Group, The New York Times, the Los Angeles Times, and The Washington Post.

History
Tribune Media Services first began to offer online listings services as a content provider to the online services Prodigy in the late 1980s and America Online in the early 1990s.  TMS launched its first branded online television listings service, TV Quest, in 1993 on the AppleLink online service.  TV Quest later migrated to Apple's eWorld services and to the internet in the mid-1990s.

Version 1.0 of Zap2it debuted on the web in May 2000.  In its earliest iteration, the site was a combination of TMS-owned listings sites TVQuest and MovieQuest plus the then-recently purchased content site UltimateTV.

UltimateTV offered viewers and industry insiders breaking news, Nielsen ratings, live celebrity chats and more.  The site provided video clips, interviews and promos in its Promo Lounge area.

The earliest Zap2it focused on films, television and original web-based content.  The site offered original editorials along with listings information for films, television and online.  It also listed online content such as short films, interactive games and webisodes offered by Atom Films, Shockwave.com and iFilm.

Zap2it's television listings and film showtimes were generated by TMS data, with web listings by Yack data.

The site's editorial pages, including the front page, were redesigned in 2001.  In early 2003, the editorial focus of Zap2it was narrowed down to television and films, and the site was again redesigned.  An agreement with Fandango in 2005 allowed for the introduction of online movie ticketing for select theaters.  Blogs, including It Happened Last Night, which offered show recaps, were first launched in 2006 and expanded thereafter.  In 2007, the site launched "click-to-record" functionality allowing users with TiVo digital video recorders to remotely schedule recordings directly from within the Zap2it television listings.

The site launched TVOvermind, a blog dedicated to episodic recaps hosted as a subdomain on the Zap2it website, in 2008. It was later purchased by BC Media Group in 2012.

On October 3, 2016, the site was rebranded as Screener.

In April 2017, Tribune Media announced the end of editorial content on Screener TV. No new editorial content has been added since. By January 2018, the TV Listings section and TV by the Numbers were the only thing left on the site, as the site reverted to the Zap2it name. TV by the Numbers ended operations at the end of January 2020.

Product development
In early 2007, Zap2it released enhanced television listings on its main site. Upgrades to the product included improved performance, better customization capabilities and the introduction of sharing tools and a user rating system. Following a testing period, the television-listings product was made available to affiliates.

In 2008, a revised movie-showtimes product was developed on the main site.  It more prominently showcased movie trailers and offered expanded cast and crew lists which linked to celebrity profile pages.

Editorial development
In February 2009, Zap2it began to play an expanded role within the Tribune Company. The site became the central aggregator of entertainment content produced by Tribune-owned online properties including latimes.com, The Envelope, chicagotribune.com and others. As part of this development, a major site redesign was planned for midyear 2009.

See also
 List of assets owned by Tribune Company
 Lists of websites

References

External links
 

2000 establishments in the United States
Aggregation websites
English-language websites
American film websites
Internet properties established in 2000
Television websites